May Day is a character in the James Bond film A View to a Kill, played by actress Grace Jones.

In the film
May Day works as a bodyguard for Max Zorin, and is also his lover. She kills Achille Aubergine (escaping from Bond by jumping from the Eiffel Tower) and Godfrey Tibbett. She has sexual intercourse with James Bond during the film, dominating him by being on top.

When she fights Bond at the end of the film, however, May Day realizes Zorin has left her to die in his mine, and says, "And I thought that creep loved me!" She then helps Bond move a bomb clear of the mine with a handcar. She willingly drives it out of the mine, where it detonates, killing her.

Casting
Grace Jones was suggested for the role by former Bond girl Barbara Bach. Lisa Funnell notes that May Day was "privileged in the film's promotion, standing back-to-back with Bond in movie posters that asked, "Has James Bond finally met his match?""

B. J. Worth was the stunt double in the Eiffel Tower scene.

Analysis
Commentators have extensively discussed May Day's position as a black woman, especially in regards to her strength. James Chapman argues that May Day is a "highly problematic character within the terms of the Bond series: as a dominant woman (and, moreover, a dominant black woman) she represents a challenge to Bond's masculinity which is never properly resolved." Chapman concludes that "in terms of the sexist code of the Bond films, May Day is simply too problematic to be allowed to live." Kristen Shaw argues that
May Day is represented as a monstrous female: she is unapologetically violent, has superhuman strength, and seduces Bond by jumping on top of him and taking control. Although she switches allegiances at the conclusion of the film, helping Bond and sacrificing her life in the process, she remains coded as animalistic, non-human, and deviant. These black women are reduced to stereotypes; both are hyper-sexualized and represented as duplicitous and violent.

Travis L. Wagner notes that May Day is "presented as being physically strong and sexually alluring." He argues that "May Day can be read as a distinct postcolonial subaltern Other". Wagner goes on to suggest that 
As a subaltern, May Day decidedly lacks a voice for most of the film, often resorting to brutish, violent feats of strength to express her thoughts, all the while reinforcing the colonial rhetoric of the Other as a beast. For May Day, physical actions trump verbal expressions, and this is most notable in her sexual encounter with Bond, where she silently disrobes and jumps into bed with him.

Charles Burnetts sees May Day as a "fluffer" character: a member of a group of women in the Bond films whom Bond seduces earlier in the movie but who disappear by the end and serve only to keep the male "agent" aroused until the arrival of the primary sexual object, the Bond girl. Burnetts suggests that May Day
Embodies aspects of both the “animalistic sexuality” of a colonizing white male fantasy... and a hyper-masculinity that threatens to destabilize Bond’s sexual politics. I argue that May Day serves as a high-watermark for the fluffer character, and, true to her name, as a kind of emergency distress signal with respect to the Bond film's racial and gender politics.

A number of commentators compare May Day to Stacey Sutton, who is the main Bond girl in the film: Paul Simpson argues that Sutton is "consistently overshadowed by Grace Jones' May Day," Chapman suggests that May Day is a "far more memorable character" than Sutton," while Lisa Funnell says that May Day outshines the rest of cast. Burnetts argues that May Day represents
An ideal of athleticism, aggression, and strength that dominates not only her childlike employer/lover Max Zorin, but Bond himself throughout the film. May Day also narratively and spatially upstages her conventionally beautiful and white Bond Girl counterpart Stacey Sutton, only to be made scarce and then finally removed like other fluffer characters in the film’s latter half. As if to register her resistance to the fluffer mantle imposed on her by the film's eventual privileging of Sutton, May Day dominates the first half of the film in narrative, sexual, and spatial terms. In at least two sequences, Bond’s surveillance of Sutton is disrupted by the entrance of May Day into his field of vision, motioning for him to turn away and mind his own business. Bond’s classical (white) male gaze, trained voyeuristically again on a "woman as image", is disrupted here by May Day, a woman of color, who turns the gaze upon Bond himself. Such gender instabilities inevitably extend to the bedroom, where Bond is uncharacteristically dominated by her, a submissiveness on his part that the film struggles to contain.

Screen Rant rates May Day as the bravest of all the Bond girls.

References

Bond girls
Bond villains
Film characters introduced in 1985
Fictional African-American people
Fictional henchmen
Fictional bodyguards
Fictional wushu practitioners
Fictional kickboxers
Female film villains
A View to a Kill
Black characters in films